Carlos José Iturgaiz Angulo (born 20 October 1965 in Santurce, Biscay) is a Spanish politician of the People's Party (PP) who served as a Member of the European Parliament from 2004 until 2019.

Education
He first studied extinct languages and then became a qualified accordion teacher.

Member of the European Parliament
Iturgaiz served as vice-chairman of the Committee on Petitions (PETI) and of the delegation for relations with the countries of Central America from 2009. He was chairman of the delegation for relations with the Maghreb countries and the Arab Maghreb Union (including Libya) from 27 February 2008 until 13 July 2009.

From 16 September 2009, Iturgaiz was a substitute member of the delegation for relations with the countries of Southeast Asia and the ASEAN (Association of Southeast Asian Nations). From 2010, he was as substitute member of the Committee on Fisheries.

Iturgaiz failed to secure his re-election in the 2014 European elections. However, when his party colleague Miguel Arias Cañete was nominated as European Commissioner in late 2014, Iturgaiz took his seat in the European Parliament. He has since been a member of the Committee on Fisheries.

In September 2018, Iturgaiz voted against the European Union triggering article 7 procedure against Hungary, due to the country's government posing a “systematic threat” to democracy and the rule of law.

Political mandates

Local mandates
 2020-          : Member of the Basque Parliament
 1994–2004: Member of the Basque Parliament
 1991–1993: Member of the Biscay Provincial Council
 1991–1995: Member of Bilbao City council

Mandates inside the PP
 1993–1996: Secretary-General of the PP in the Basque Country
 1996–2004: Chairman of the PP in the Basque Country

European mandates
 2004-2009: Member of the European Parliament, European People's Party (Christian Democrats) and European Democrats
 Since 2009: Member of the European Parliament, European People's Party (Christian Democrats)

See also
 2004 European Parliament election in Spain

References

External links
 
 

1965 births
Living people
People's Party (Spain) MEPs
MEPs for Spain 2004–2009
MEPs for Spain 2009–2014
MEPs for Spain 2014–2019
People from Santurtzi
Members of the 12th Basque Parliament
Members of the 5th Basque Parliament
Members of the 6th Basque Parliament
Members of the 7th Basque Parliament
Leaders of political parties in Spain
Municipal councillors in the Basque Country (autonomous community)